Antoni Putro Nugroho (born 25 February 1994) is an Indonesian professional footballer who plays as a winger for Liga 1 club Bhayangkara.

Club career 
On 21 December 2015, Antoni signed a contract with Barito Putera to commence ahead of the 2015 Indonesia Super League. He made his debut on 4 April 2015 as starting line-up, which ended 2–0 victory against Persela Lamongan.

On 1 September 2016, Antoni joined Bhayangkara. On 2018, Antony joined PSMS Medan and will be the part of the team for Liga 1 2018 Season

International career
In 2010, Antoni Nugroho represented the Indonesia U-16, in the 2010 AFC U-16 Championship. Antoni also scored a two goals in the group stage game as his team win 4-1 against Tajikistan U-16.

Honours

Club
Bhayangkara
 Liga 1: 2017

References

External links 
 
 Antoni Nugroho at Liga Indonesia

1994 births
Living people
People from Bantul Regency
Indonesian footballers
Liga 1 (Indonesia) players
PS Barito Putera players
Arema F.C. players
Bhayangkara F.C. players
PSMS Medan players
Kalteng Putra F.C. players
PSS Sleman players
Persik Kediri players
Indonesia youth international footballers
Sportspeople from Special Region of Yogyakarta
Association football forwards